Žár is a municipality and village in České Budějovice District in the South Bohemian Region of the Czech Republic. It has about 300 inhabitants.

Administrative parts
Villages of Božejov and Žumberk are administrative parts of Žár.

References

Villages in České Budějovice District